Dunsinane Mountain, or officially Dunsinane, is a  mountain summit located in Hinsdale County, of Colorado, United States. It is situated 11 miles east of the community of Ridgway, in the Uncompahgre Wilderness, on land managed by Uncompahgre National Forest. It is part of the San Juan Mountains which are a subset of the Rocky Mountains, and is situated west of the Continental Divide. The mountain's name was officially adopted as Dunsinane by the United States Board on Geographic Names in 1966, and is so named because it resembles the castle Dunsinane of Shakespeare's Macbeth.

Climate 
According to the Köppen climate classification system, Dunsinane is located in an alpine subarctic climate zone with cold, snowy winters, and cool to warm summers. Due to its altitude, it receives precipitation all year, as snow in winter, and as thunderstorms in summer, with a dry period in late spring. Precipitation runoff from the mountain drains into tributaries of the Cimarron River.

Gallery

See also 

Chimney Rock

References

External links 

 Dunsinane: Weather forecast
 Dunsinane Mountain Climbing: Mountainproject.com

Mountains of Hinsdale County, Colorado
San Juan Mountains (Colorado)
Mountains of Colorado
North American 3000 m summits
Uncompahgre National Forest